The European Charter on Freedom of the Press is a non-binding guideline on press freedom, signed on 25 May 2009 in Hamburg by 48 editors-in-chief and leading journalists from 19 European countries. It is open for signature by all journalists, e.g. the prohibition of censorship, free access to national and foreign media sources and freedom to gather and disseminate information.

Content
The Charter condense in 10 articles the main media freedom principles, including the right to safety from surveillance, electronic eavesdropping and searches of editorial departments and computers, and remarks the need for unimpeded access for journalists and citizens to all domestic and foreign sources of information. It formulates the main values that public authorities - including EU institutions - should respect when dealing with journalists.

History
The idea of the Charter was born in 2007 out of the yearly policy dialogue which started in 2005 between European Commissioner Viviane Reding (assisted by the Commission's Media Task Force) and the editors-in-chief of European newspapers, headed by Stern's Hans-Ulrich Jörges.

The Charter was handed to the European Commission in Brussels on 9 June 2009 and to the Council of Europe in Luxembourg on 26 October 2009, with the aim that it may become a benchmark in their assessment exercises on media freedom in member and candidate countries, and that it may empower journalists across Europe in their relations with state authorities.

Initial Signers of the Charter

See also 
 Media freedom
 European Centre for Press and Media Freedom

References

External links 
 European Charter on Freedom of the Press, European Centre for Press and Media Freedom

Freedom of the press
Mass media regulation
2009 documents